In quantum field theory, the energy that a particle has as a result of changes that it causes in its environment defines self-energy , and represents the contribution to the particle's energy, or effective mass, due to interactions between the particle and its environment. In electrostatics, the energy required to assemble the charge distribution takes the form of self-energy by bringing in the constituent charges from infinity, where the electric force goes to zero. In a condensed matter context relevant to electrons moving in a material, the self-energy represents the potential felt by the electron due to the surrounding medium's interactions with it.  Since electrons repel each other the moving electron polarizes, or causes to displace the electrons in its vicinity and then changes the potential of the moving electron fields. These are examples of self-energy.

Characteristics
Mathematically, this energy is equal to the so-called on mass shell value of the proper self-energy operator (or proper mass operator) in the momentum-energy representation (more precisely, to  times this value). In this, or other representations (such as the space-time representation), the self-energy is pictorially (and economically) represented by means of Feynman diagrams, such as the one shown below. In this particular diagram, the three arrowed straight lines represent particles, or particle propagators, and the wavy line a particle-particle interaction; removing (or amputating) the left-most and the right-most straight lines in the diagram shown below (these so-called external lines correspond to prescribed values for, for instance, momentum and energy, or four-momentum), one retains a contribution to the self-energy operator (in, for instance, the momentum-energy representation). Using a small number of simple rules, each Feynman diagram can be readily expressed in its corresponding algebraic form.

In general, the on-the-mass-shell value of the self-energy operator in the momentum-energy representation is complex. In such cases, it is the real part of this self-energy that is identified with the physical self-energy (referred to above as particle's "self-energy"); the inverse of the imaginary part is a measure for the lifetime of the particle under investigation. For clarity, elementary excitations, or dressed particles (see quasi-particle), in interacting systems are distinct from stable particles in vacuum; their state functions consist of complicated superpositions of the eigenstates of the underlying many-particle system, which only momentarily, if at all, behave like those specific to isolated particles; the above-mentioned lifetime is the time over which a dressed particle behaves as if it were a single particle with well-defined momentum and energy.

Multiplying on the left by the inverse  of the operator 
and on the right by  yields

The photon and gluon do not get a mass through renormalization because gauge symmetry protects them from getting a mass.  This is a consequence of the Ward identity.  The W-boson  and the Z-boson get their masses through the Higgs mechanism; they do undergo mass renormalization through the renormalization of the electroweak theory.

Neutral particles with internal quantum numbers can mix with each other through virtual pair production. The primary example of this phenomenon is the mixing of neutral kaons. Under appropriate simplifying assumptions this can be described without quantum field theory.

Other uses 
In chemistry, the self-energy or Born energy of an ion is the energy associated with the field of the ion itself.

In solid state and condensed-matter physics self-energies and a myriad of related quasiparticle properties are calculated by Green's function methods and Green's function (many-body theory) of interacting low-energy excitations on the basis of electronic band structure calculations. Self-energies also find extensive application in the calculation of particle transport through open quantum systems and the embedding of sub-regions into larger systems (for example the surface of a semi-infinite crystal).

See also 
 Quantum field theory
 QED vacuum
 Renormalization
 Self-force
 GW approximation
 Wheeler–Feynman absorber theory

References 

 A. L. Fetter, and J. D. Walecka, Quantum Theory of Many-Particle Systems (McGraw-Hill, New York, 1971); (Dover, New York, 2003)
 J. W. Negele, and H. Orland, Quantum Many-Particle Systems (Westview Press, Boulder, 1998)
 A. A. Abrikosov, L. P. Gorkov and I. E. Dzyaloshinski (1963): Methods of Quantum Field Theory in Statistical Physics Englewood Cliffs: Prentice-Hall.
 
 A. N. Vasil'ev The Field Theoretic Renormalization Group in Critical Behavior Theory and Stochastic Dynamics (Routledge Chapman & Hall 2004); ; 
 

Quantum electrodynamics
Quantum field theory
Renormalization group